Bordeaux (Gascon  ; ;) is a port city on the river Garonne in the Gironde department, Southwestern France. It is the capital of the Nouvelle-Aquitaine region, as well as the prefecture of the Gironde department. Its inhabitants are called "Bordelais" (masculine) or "Bordelaises" (feminine). The term "Bordelais" may also refer to the city and its surrounding region.

Bordeaux and 27 suburban municipalities form the Bordeaux Metropolis, an indirectly elected metropolitan authority now in charge of wider metropolitan issues. The Bordeaux Metropolis, with a population of 819,604 at the Jan. 2020 census, is the fifth most populated metropolitan council in France after those of Paris, Marseille, Lyon and Lille.

Bordeaux is a world capital of wine: many castles and vineyards stand on the hillsides of the Gironde, and the city is home to the world's main wine fair, Vinexpo. Bordeaux is also one of the centers of gastronomy and business tourism for the organization of international congresses. It is a central and strategic hub for the aeronautics, military and space sector, home to international companies such as Dassault Aviation, Ariane Group, Safran and Thalès. The link with aviation dates back to 1910, the year the first airplane flew over the city. A crossroads of knowledge through university research, it is home to one of the only two megajoule lasers in the world, as well as a university population of more than 130,000 students within the Bordeaux Metropolis.

Bordeaux is an international tourist destination for its architectural and cultural heritage with more than 350 historic monuments, making it, after Paris, the city with the most listed or registered monuments in France. The "Pearl of Aquitaine" has been voted European Destination of the year in a 2015 online poll. The metropolis has also received awards and rankings by international organizations such as in 1957, Bordeaux was awarded the Europe Prize for its efforts in transmitting the European ideal. In June 2007, the Port of the Moon in historic Bordeaux was inscribed on the UNESCO World Heritage List, for its outstanding architecture and urban ensemble and in recognition of Bordeaux's international importance over the last 2000 years. Bordeaux is also ranked as a Sufficiency city by the Globalization and World Cities Research Network.

History

5th century BC to 11th century AD 

Around 300 BC, the region was the settlement of a Celtic tribe, the Bituriges Vivisci, named the town Burdigala, probably of Aquitanian origin.

In 107 BC, the Battle of Burdigala was fought by the Romans who were defending the Allobroges, a Gallic tribe allied to Rome, and the Tigurini led by Divico. The Romans were defeated and their commander, the consul Lucius Cassius Longinus, was killed in battle.

The city came under Roman rule around 60 BC, and it became an important commercial centre for tin and lead. During this period were built the amphitheatre and the monument Les Piliers de Tutelle.

In 276, it was sacked by the Vandals. The Vandals attacked again in 409, followed by the Visigoths in 414, and the Franks in 498, and afterwards the city fell into a period of relative obscurity.

In the late sixth century the city re-emerged as the seat of a county and an archdiocese within the Merovingian kingdom of the Franks, but royal Frankish power was never strong. The city started to play a regional role as a major urban center on the fringes of the newly founded Frankish Duchy of Vasconia. Around 585 Gallactorius was made Count of Bordeaux and fought the Basques.

In 732, the city was plundered by the troops of Abd er Rahman who stormed the fortifications and overwhelmed the Aquitanian garrison. Duke Eudes mustered a force to engage the Umayyads, eventually engaging them in the Battle of the River Garonne somewhere near the river Dordogne. The battle had a high death toll, and although Eudes was defeated he had enough troops to engage in the Battle of Poitiers and so retain his grip on Aquitaine.

In 737, following his father Eudes's death, the Aquitanian duke Hunald led a rebellion to which Charles responded by launching an expedition that captured Bordeaux. However, it was not retained for long, during the following year the Frankish commander clashed in battle with the Aquitanians but then left to take on hostile Burgundian authorities and magnates. In 745 Aquitaine faced another expedition where Charles's sons Pepin and Carloman challenged Hunald's power and defeated him. Hunald's son Waifer replaced him and confirmed Bordeaux as the capital city (along with Bourges in the north).

During the last stage of the war against Aquitaine (760–768), it was one of Waifer's last important strongholds to fall to the troops of King Pepin the Short.  Charlemagne built the fortress of Fronsac (Frontiacus, Franciacus) near Bordeaux on a hill across the border with the Basques (Wascones), where Basque commanders came and pledged their loyalty (769).

In 778, Seguin (or Sihimin) was appointed count of Bordeaux, probably undermining the power of the Duke Lupo, and possibly leading to the Battle of Roncevaux Pass. In 814, Seguin was made Duke of Vasconia, but was deposed in 816 for failing to suppress a Basque rebellion. Under the Carolingians, sometimes the Counts of Bordeaux held the title concomitantly with that of Duke of Vasconia. They were to keep the Basques in check and defend the mouth of the Garonne from the Vikings when they appeared in c. 844. In Autumn 845, the Vikings were raiding Bordeaux and Saintes, count Seguin II marched on them but was captured and executed.

Although the port of Bordeaux was a buzzing trade center, the stability and success of the city was threatened by Viking and Norman incursions and political instability. The restoration of the Ramnulfid Dukes of Aquitaine under William IV and his successors (known as the House of Poitiers) brought continuity of government.

12th century to 15th century, the English era 

From the 12th to the 15th century, Bordeaux flourished once more following the marriage of Eléonore, Duchess of Aquitaine and the last of the House of Poitiers, to Henry II Plantagenêt, Count of Anjou and the grandson of Henry I of England, who succeeded to the English crown months after their wedding, bringing into being the vast Angevin Empire, which stretched from the Pyrenees to Ireland. After granting a tax-free trade status with England, Henry was adored by the locals as they could be even more profitable in the wine trade, their main source of income, and the city benefited from imports of cloth and wheat. The belfry (Grosse Cloche) and city cathedral St-André were built, the latter in 1227, incorporating the artisan quarter of Saint-Paul. Under the terms of the Treaty of Brétigny it became briefly the capital of an independent state (1362–1372) under Edward, the Black Prince, but after the Battle of Castillon (1453) it was annexed by France.

15th century to 17th century 

In 1462, Bordeaux created a local parliament.

Bordeaux adhered to the Fronde, being effectively annexed to the Kingdom of France only in 1653, when the army of Louis XIV entered the city.

18th century, the golden era 

The 18th century saw another golden age of Bordeaux. The Port of the Moon supplied the majority of Europe with coffee, cocoa, sugar, cotton and indigo, becoming France's busiest port and the second busiest port in the world after London. Many downtown buildings (about 5,000), including those on the quays, are from this period.

Bordeaux was also a major trading centre for slaves. In total, the Bordeaux shipowners deported 150,000 Africans in some 500 expeditions.

French Revolution: political disruption and loss of the most profitable colony 

At the beginning of the French Revolution (1789), many local revolutionaries were members of the Girondists. This Party represented the provincial bourgeoisie, favorable towards abolishing aristocracy privileges, but opposed to the Revolution's social dimension. In 1793, the Montagnards led by Robespierre and Marat came to power. Fearing a bourgeois misappropriation of the Revolution, they executed a great number of Girondists. During the purge, the local Montagnard Section renamed the city of Bordeaux "Commune-Franklin" (Franklin-municipality) in homage to Benjamin Franklin.

At the same time, in 1791, a slave revolt broke out at Saint-Domingue (current Haiti), the most profitable of the French colonies. Three years later, the Montagnard Convention abolished slavery. In 1802, Napoleon revoked the manumission law but lost the war against the army of former slaves. In 1804, Haiti became independent. The loss of this "Pearl" of the West Indies generated the collapse of Bordeaux's port economy, which was dependent on the colonial trade and trade in slaves.

Towards the end of the Peninsular War of 1814, the Duke of Wellington sent William Beresford with two divisions and seized Bordeaux, encountering little resistance. Bordeaux was largely anti-Bonapartist and the majority supported the Bourbons. The British troops were treated as liberators.

19th century, rebirth of the economy 

From the Bourbon Restoration, the economy of Bordeaux was rebuilt by traders and shipowners. They engaged to construct the first bridge of Bordeaux, and customs warehouses. The shipping traffic grew through the new African colonies.

Georges-Eugène Haussmann, a longtime prefect of Bordeaux, used Bordeaux's 18th-century large-scale rebuilding as a model when he was asked by Emperor Napoleon III to transform the quasi-medieval Paris into a "modern" capital that would make France proud. Victor Hugo found the town so beautiful he said: "Take Versailles, add Antwerp, and you have Bordeaux".

In 1870, at the beginning of the Franco-Prussian war against Prussia, the French government temporarily relocated to Bordeaux from Paris. That recurred during World War I and again very briefly during World War II, when it became clear that Paris would fall into German hands.

20th century 

During World War II, Bordeaux fell under German occupation.

In May and June 1940, Bordeaux was the site of the life-saving actions of the Portuguese consul-general, Aristides de Sousa Mendes, who illegally granted thousands of Portuguese visas, which were needed to pass the Spanish border, to refugees fleeing the German occupation.

From 1941 to 1943, the Italian Royal Navy established BETASOM, a submarine base at Bordeaux. Italian submarines participated in the Battle of the Atlantic from that base, which was also a major base for German U-boats as headquarters of 12th U-boat Flotilla. The massive, reinforced concrete U-boat pens have proved impractical to demolish and are now partly used as a cultural center for exhibitions.

21st century, listed as World heritage 

In 2007, 40% of the city surface area, located around the Port of the Moon, was listed as World heritage sites. Unesco inscribed Bordeaux as "an inhabited historic city, an outstanding urban and architectural ensemble, created in the age of the Enlightenment, whose values continued up to the first half of the 20th century, with more protected buildings than any other French city except Paris".

Geography 

Bordeaux is located close to the European Atlantic coast, in the southwest of France and in the north of the Aquitaine region. The city is built on a bend of the river Garonne, and is divided into two parts: the right bank to the east and left bank in the west. Historically the left bank is more developed because when flowing outside the bend, the water makes a furrow of the required depth to allow the passing of merchant ships, which used to offload on this side of the river. But, today, the right bank is developing, including new urban projects. In Bordeaux, the Garonne River is accessible to ocean liners through the Gironde estuary. The right bank of the Garonne is a low-lying, often marshy plain.

Climate 

Bordeaux's climate can be classified as oceanic (Köppen climate classification Cfb). However, the Trewartha climate classification system classifies the city as humid subtropical, due to a recent rise in temperatures related - to some degree or another - to climate change and the city's urban heat island.

The city enjoys cool to mild, wet winters, due to its relatively southerly latitude, and the prevalence of mild, westerly winds from the Atlantic. Its summers are warm and somewhat drier, although wet enough to avoid a Mediterranean classification. Frosts occur annually, but snowfall is quite infrequent, occurring for no more than 3-4 days a year.

Economy 
Bordeaux is a major centre for business in France as it has the sixth largest metropolitan population in France. It serves as a major regional center for trade, administration, services and industry.

Wine 

The vine was introduced to the Bordeaux region by the Romans, probably in the mid-first century, to provide wine for local consumption, and wine production has been continuous in the region since.

With an annual production of approximately 960 million bottles, the Bordeaux area produces large quantities of everyday wine as well as some of the most expensive wines in the world. Included among the latter are the area's five premier cru (First Growth) red wines (four from Médoc and one, Château Haut-Brion, from Graves), established by the Bordeaux Wine Official Classification of 1855:

Both red and white wines are made in the Bordeaux region. Red Bordeaux wine is called claret in the United Kingdom. Red wines are generally made from a blend of grapes, and may be made from Cabernet Sauvignon, Merlot, Cabernet Franc, Petit verdot, Malbec, and, less commonly in recent years, Carménère.

White Bordeaux is made from Sauvignon blanc, Sémillon, and Muscadelle. Sauternes is a sub-region of Graves known for its intensely sweet, white, dessert wines such as Château d'Yquem.

Because of a wine glut (wine lake) in the generic production, the price squeeze induced by an increasingly strong international competition, and vine pull schemes, the number of growers has recently dropped from 14,000 and the area under vine has also decreased significantly. In the meantime, the global demand for first growths and the most famous labels markedly increased and their prices skyrocketed.

The Cité du Vin, a museum as well as a place of exhibitions, shows, movie projections and academic seminars on the theme of wine opened its doors in June 2016.

Others 
The Laser Mégajoule will be one of the most powerful lasers in the world, allowing fundamental research and the development of the laser and plasma technologies.

Some 20,000 people work for the aeronautic industry in Bordeaux. The city has some of the biggest companies including Dassault, EADS Sogerma, Snecma, Thales, SNPE, and others. The Dassault Falcon private jets are built there as well as the military aircraft Rafale and Mirage 2000, the Airbus A380 cockpit, the boosters of Ariane 5, and the M51 SLBM missile.

Tourism, especially wine tourism, is a major industry. Globelink.co.uk mentioned Bordeaux as the best tourist destination in Europe in 2015. Gourmet Touring is a tourism company operating in the Bordeaux wine region.

Access to the port from the Atlantic is via the Gironde estuary. Almost nine million tonnes of goods arrive and leave each year.

Major companies 
This list includes indigenous Bordeaux-based companies and companies that have major presence in Bordeaux, but are not necessarily headquartered there.

Arena
Groupe Bernard
Groupe Castel
Cdiscount
Dassault
Jock
Marie Brizard
McKesson Corporation
Oxbow
Ricard
Sanofi Aventis
Smurfit Kappa
Snecma
Solectron
Thales Group

Population 

In January 2020, there were 259,809 inhabitants in the city proper (commune) of Bordeaux. The commune (including Caudéran which was annexed by Bordeaux in 1965) had its largest population of 284,494 at the 1954 census. The majority of the population is French, but there are sizable groups of Italians, Spaniards (Up to 20% of the Bordeaux population claim some degree of Spanish heritage), Portuguese, Turks, Germans.

The built-up area has grown for more than a century beyond the municipal borders of Bordeaux due to the small size of the commune and urban sprawl, so that by January 2020 there were 1,376,375 people living in the overall  metropolitan area (aire d'attraction) of Bordeaux, only a fifth of whom lived in the city proper.

Politics

Municipal administration 

The Mayor of the city is the environmentalist Pierre Hurmic.

Bordeaux is the capital of five cantons and the Prefecture of the Gironde and Aquitaine.

The town is divided into three districts, the first three of Gironde. The headquarters of Urban Community of Bordeaux Mériadeck is located in the neighbourhood and the city is at the head of the Chamber of Commerce and Industry that bears his name.

The number of inhabitants of Bordeaux is greater than 250,000 and less than 299,999 so the number of municipal councilors is 65. They are divided according to the following composition:

Mayors of Bordeaux 

Since the Liberation (1944), there have been six mayors of Bordeaux:

RPR was renamed to UMP in 2002 which was later renamed to LR in 2015

Elections

Presidential elections of 2007 
At the 2007 presidential election, the Bordelais gave 31.37% of their votes to Ségolène Royal of the Socialist Party against 30.84% to Nicolas Sarkozy, president of the UMP. Then came François Bayrou with 22.01%, followed by Jean-Marie Le Pen who recorded 5.42%. None of the other candidates exceeded the 5% mark. Nationally, Nicolas Sarkozy led with 31.18%, then Ségolène Royal with 25.87%, followed by François Bayrou with 18.57%. After these came Jean-Marie Le Pen with 10.44%, none of the other candidates exceeded the 5% mark. In the second round, the city of Bordeaux gave Ségolène Royal 52.44% against 47.56% for Nicolas Sarkozy, the latter being elected President of the Republic with 53.06% against 46.94% for Ségolène Royal. The abstention rates for Bordeaux were 14.52% in the first round and 15.90% in the second round.

Parliamentary elections of 2007 
In the parliamentary elections of 2007, the left won eight constituencies against only three for the right. It should be added that after the partial 2008 elections, the eighth district of Gironde switched to the left, bringing the count to nine. In Bordeaux, the left was for the first time in its history the majority as it held two of three constituencies following the elections. In the first division of the Gironde, the outgoing UMP MP Chantal Bourragué was well ahead with 44.81% against 25.39% for the Socialist candidate Beatrice Desaigues. In the second round, it was Chantal Bourragué who was re-elected with 54.45% against 45.55% for his socialist opponent. In the second district of Gironde the UMP mayor and all new Minister of Ecology, Energy, Sustainable Development and the Sea Alain Juppé confronted the General Counsel PS Michèle Delaunay. In the first round, Alain Juppé was well ahead with 43.73% against 31.36% for Michèle Delaunay. In the second round, it was finally Michèle Delaunay who won the election with 50.93% of the votes against 49.07% for Alain Juppé, the margin being only 670 votes. The defeat of the so-called constituency "Mayor" showed that Bordeaux was rocking increasingly left. Finally, in the third constituency of the Gironde, Noël Mamère was well ahead with 39.82% against 28.42% for the UMP candidate Elizabeth Vine. In the second round, Noël Mamère was re-elected with 62.82% against 37.18% for his right-wing rival.

Municipal elections of 2008 
In 2008 municipal elections saw the clash between mayor of Bordeaux, Alain Juppé and the President of the Regional Council of Aquitaine Socialist Alain Rousset. The PS had put up a Socialist heavyweight in the Gironde and had put great hopes in this election after the victory of Ségolène Royal and Michèle Delaunay in 2007. However, after a rather exciting campaign it was Alain Juppé who was widely elected in the first round with 56.62%, far ahead of Alain Rousset who has managed to get 34.14%. At present, of the eight cantons that has Bordeaux, five are held by the PS and three by the UMP, the left eating a little each time into the right's numbers.

European elections of 2009 
In the European elections of 2009, Bordeaux voters largely voted for the UMP candidate Dominique Baudis, who won 31.54% against 15.00% for PS candidate Kader Arif. The candidate of Europe Ecology José Bové came second with 22.34%. None of the other candidates reached the 10% mark. The 2009 European elections were like the previous ones in eight constituencies. Bordeaux is located in the district "Southwest", here are the results:

UMP candidate Dominique Baudis: 26.89%. His party gained four seats. PS candidate Kader Arif: 17.79%, gaining two seats in the European Parliament. Europe Ecology candidate Bove: 15.83%, obtaining two seats. MoDem candidate Robert Rochefort: 8.61%, winning a seat. Left Front candidate Jean-Luc Mélenchon: 8.16%, gaining the last seat. At regional elections in 2010, the Socialist incumbent president Alain Rousset won the first round by totaling 35.19% in Bordeaux, but this score was lower than the plan for Gironde and Aquitaine. Xavier Darcos, Minister of Labour followed with 28.40% of the votes, scoring above the regional and departmental average. Then came Monique De Marco, Green candidate with 13.40%, followed by the member of Pyrenees-Atlantiques and candidate of the MoDem Jean Lassalle who registered a low 6.78% while qualifying to the second round on the whole Aquitaine, closely followed by Jacques Colombier, candidate of the National Front, who gained 6.48%. Finally the candidate of the Left Front Gérard Boulanger with 5.64%, no other candidate above the 5% mark. In the second round, Alain Rousset had a tidal wave win as national totals rose to 55.83%. If Xavier Darcos largely lost the election, he nevertheless achieved a score above the regional and departmental average obtaining 33.40%. Jean Lassalle, who qualified for the second round, passed the 10% mark by totaling 10.77%. The ballot was marked by abstention amounting to 55.51% in the first round and 53.59% in the second round.

Only candidates obtaining more than 5% are listed

2017 elections 
Bordeaux voted for Emmanuel Macron in the presidential election. In the 2017 parliamentary election, La République En Marche! won most of the constituencies in Bordeaux.

2019 European elections 
Bordeaux voted in the 2019 European Parliament election in France.

Municipal elections of 2020 

After 73 years of right-of-centre rule, the ecologist Pierre Hurmic (EELV) came in ahead of Nicolas Florian (LR/LaREM).

Parliamentary representation 
The city area is represented by the following constituencies: Gironde's 1st, Gironde's 2nd, Gironde's 3rd, Gironde's 4th, Gironde's 5th, Gironde's 6th, Gironde's 7th.

Education

University 

During Antiquity, a first university had been created by the Romans in 286. The city was an important administrative centre and the new university had to train administrators. Only rhetoric and grammar were taught. Ausonius and Sulpicius Severus were two of the teachers.

In 1441, when Bordeaux was an English town, the Pope Eugene IV created a university by demand of the archbishop Pey Berland. In 1793, during the French Revolution, the National Convention abolished the university, and replace them with the École centrale in 1796. In Bordeaux, this one was located in the former buildings of the college of Guyenne.
In 1808, the university reappeared with Napoleon. Bordeaux accommodates approximately 70,000 students on one of the largest campuses of Europe (235 ha).

The University of Bordeaux is divided into four:

The University Bordeaux 1, (Maths, Physical sciences and Technologies), 10,693 students in 2002
The University Bordeaux 2, Bordeaux Segalen (Medicine and Life sciences), 15,038 students in 2002
The University Bordeaux 3, Michel de Montaigne (Liberal arts, Humanities, Languages, History), 14,785 students in 2002
The University Bordeaux 4, Montesquieu (Law, Economy and Management), 12,556 students in 2002
Institut of Political Sciences of Bordeaux. Although technically a part of the fourth university, it largely functions autonomously.

Schools 
Bordeaux has numerous public and private schools offering undergraduate and postgraduate programs.

Engineering schools:
Arts et Métiers ParisTech, graduate school of industrial and mechanical engineering
ESME-Sudria, graduate school of engineering
École nationale supérieure d'électronique, informatique, télécommunications, mathématique et mécanique de Bordeaux (ENSEIRB-MATMECA)
École supérieure de technologie des biomolécules de Bordeaux
École nationale supérieure des sciences agronomiques de Bordeaux Aquitaine
École nationale supérieure de chimie et physique de Bordeaux
École pour l'informatique et les nouvelles technologies
Institut des sciences et techniques des aliments de Bordeaux
Institut de cognitique
École supérieure d'informatique
École privée des sciences informatiques

Business and management schools:

The Bordeaux MBA (International College of Bordeaux)
IUT Techniques de Commercialisation of Bordeaux (business school)
INSEEC Business School (Institut des hautes études économiques et commerciales)
KEDGE Business School (former BEM – Bordeaux Management School)
Vatel Bordeaux International Business School
E-Artsup
Institut supérieur européen de gestion group
Institut supérieur européen de formation par l'action

Other:

École nationale de la magistrature (National school for the judiciary)

 (EFAP)
 (CNAM)
 (law school)

Weekend education 

The , a part-time Japanese supplementary school, is held in the Salle de L'Athénée Municipal in Bordeaux.

Main sights

Heritage and architecture 

Bordeaux is classified "City of Art and History". The city is home to 362 monuments historiques (only Paris has more in France) with some buildings dating back to Roman times. Bordeaux, Port of the Moon, has been inscribed on UNESCO World Heritage List as "an outstanding urban and architectural ensemble".

Bordeaux is home to one of Europe's biggest 18th-century architectural urban areas, making it a sought-after destination for tourists and cinema production crews. It stands out as one of the first French cities, after Nancy, to have entered an era of urbanism and metropolitan big scale projects, with the team Gabriel father and son, architects for King Louis XV, under the supervision of two intendants (Governors), first Nicolas-François Dupré de Saint-Maur then the Marquis de Tourny.

Saint-André Cathedral, Saint-Michel Basilica and Saint-Seurin Basilica are part of the World Heritage Sites of the Routes of Santiago de Compostela in France. The organ in Saint-Louis-des-Chartrons is registered on the French monuments historiques.

Buildings 

Main sights include:
 Place de la Bourse (1735–1755), designed by the Royal architect Jacques Gabriel as landscape for an equestrian statue of Louis XV, now replaced by the Fountain of the Three Graces.
 Grand Théâtre (1780), a large neoclassical theater built in the 18th century.
 Allées de Tourny
 Cours de l'Intendance
 Place du Chapelet
 Place du Parlement
 Place des Quinconces, the largest square in France.
 Monument aux Girondins
 Place Saint-Pierre
Pont de pierre (1822)
  Bordeaux Cathedral (Saint André), consecrated by Pope Urban II in 1096 and dedicated to the Apostle Saint Andrew. Of the original Romanesque edifice only a wall in the nave remains. The Royal Door is from the early 13th century, while the rest of the construction is mostly from the 14th and 15th centuries.
 Tour Pey-Berland (1440–1450), a massive, quadrangular Gothic tower annexed to the cathedral.
 Sainte-Croix church This church, dedicated to the Holy Cross, stands on the site of a seventh-century abbey destroyed by the Saracens. Rebuilt under the Carolingians, it was again destroyed by the Normans in 845 and 864. The present building was erected and was built in the late 11th and early 12th centuries.  The façade is in Romanesque style
 The Gothic Saint Michel Basilica, constructed between the end of the 14th century and the 16th century.
 Basilica of Saint Severinus, the oldest church in Bordeaux, built in the early sixth century on the site of a palaeo-Christian necropolis. It has an 11th-century portico, while the apse and transept are from the 12th.  The 13th-century nave has chapels from the 11th and the 14th centuries. The ancient crypt houses tombs of the Merovingian family.
 Église Saint-Pierre, Gothic church
 Église Saint-Éloi, Gothic church
 Église Saint-Bruno, baroque church decorated with frescoes
 Église Notre-Dame, baroque church
 Église Saint-Paul-Saint-François-Xavier, baroque church
 Palais Rohan, once the archbishop's residence, now city hall
 Palais Gallien, the remains of a late second-century Roman amphitheatre
 Porte Cailhau, a medieval gatehouse in the old city walls.
 La Grosse Cloche (15th century), the second remaining gate in the medieval walls. It was the belfry of the old Town Hall. It consists of two  circular towers and a central bell tower housing a bell weighing . The clock is from 1759.
 Grande Synagogue, completed 1882
 Rue Sainte-Catherine, the longest pedestrian street in France
 Darwin ecosystem, alternative place into former military barracks 
 The BETASOM submarine base

Contemporary architecture 

Cité Frugès, district of Pessac, built by Le Corbusier, 1924–1926, listed as UNESCO heritage
Fire Station, la Benauge, Claude Ferret/Adrien Courtois/Yves Salier, 1951–1954
Mériadeck district, 1960-70's
Court of first instance, Richard Rogers, 1998
CTBA, wood and furniture research center, A. Loisier, 1998
Hangar 14 on the Quai des Chartrons, 1999
The Management Science faculty on the Bastide, Anne Lacaton/Jean-Philippe Vassal, 2006
The Jardin botanique de la Bastide, Catherine Mosbach/Françoise Hélène Jourda/Pascal Convert, 2007
The Nuyens School complex on the Bastide, Yves Ballot/Nathalie Franck, 2007
Seeko'o Hotel on the Quai de Bacalan, King Kong architects, 2007
Matmut Atlantique stadium, Herzog & de Meuron, 2015
Cité du Vin, XTU architects, Anouk Legendre & Nicolas Desmazières, 2016
MECA, Maison de l'Économie Créative et de la culture de la Région Nouvelle-Aquitaine, Bjarke Ingels, 2019

Museums 

Musée des Beaux-Arts (Fine arts museum), one of the finest painting galleries in France with paintings by painter such as Tiziano, Veronese, Rubens, Van Dyck, Frans Hals, Claude, Chardin, Delacroix, Renoir, Seurat, Redon, Matisse and Picasso.
Musée d'Aquitaine (archeological and history museum)
Musée du Vin et du Négoce (museum of the wine trade)
Musée des Arts Décoratifs et du Design (museum of decorative arts and design)
Musée d'Histoire Naturelle (natural history museum)
Musée Mer Marine (Sea and Navy museum)
Cité du Vin
CAPC musée d'art contemporain de Bordeaux (modern art museum)
Musée national des douanes (history of French customs)
Bordeaux Patrimoine Mondial (architectural and heritage interpretation centre)
Musée d'ethnologie (ethnology museum)
Institut culturel Bernard Magrez, modern and streetart museum into an 18th-century mansion
Cervantez Institute (into the house of Goya)
Cap Sciences
Centre Jean Moulin

Memory of slavery 

Slavery was part of a growing drive for the city. Firstly, during the 18th and 19th centuries, Bordeaux was an important slave port, which saw some 500 slave expeditions that cause the deportation of 150,000 Africans by Bordeaux shipowners. Secondly, even though the "Triangular trade" represented only 5% of Bordeaux's wealth, the city's direct trade with the Caribbean, that accounted for the other 95%, concerns the colonial stuffs made by the slave (sugar, coffee, cocoa). And thirdly, in that same period, a major migratory movement by Aquitanians took place to the Caribbean colonies, with Saint-Domingue (now Haiti) being the most popular destination. 40% of the white population of the island came from Aquitaine. They prospered with plantations incomes, until the first slave revolts which concluded in 1848 in the final abolition of slavery in France.

A statue of Modeste Testas, an Ethiopian woman who was enslaved by the Bordeaux-based Testas brothers was unveiled in 2019. She was trafficked by them from West Africa, to Philadelphia (where one of the brother coerced her to have two children by him) and was ultimately freed and lived in Haiti. The bronze sculpture was created by the Haitian artists Woodly Caymitte.

A number of traces and memorial sites are visible in the city. Moreover, in May 2009, the Museum of Aquitaine opened the spaces dedicated to "Bordeaux in the 18th century, trans-Atlantic trading and slavery". This work, richly illustrated with original documents, contributes to disseminate the state of knowledge on this question, presenting above all the facts and their chronology.

The region of Bordeaux was also the land of several prominent abolitionists, as Montesquieu, Laffon de Ladébat and Elisée Reclus. Others were members of the Society of the Friends of the Blacks as the revolutionaries Boyer-Fonfrède, Gensonné, Guadet and Ducos.

Parks and gardens 

Jardin public de Bordeaux, with inside the Jardin botanique de Bordeaux
Jardin botanique de la Bastide
Parc bordelais
Parc aux Angéliques
Jardin des Lumières
Parc Rivière
Parc Floral

Pont Jacques Chaban-Delmas 

Europe's longest-span vertical-lift bridge, the Pont Jacques Chaban-Delmas, was opened in 2013 in Bordeaux, spanning the River Garonne. The €160 million bridge was inaugurated by President François Hollande and Mayor Alain Juppé on 16 March 2013. The bridge was named after the late Jacques Chaban-Delmas, who was a former Prime Minister and Mayor of Bordeaux.

Shopping 

Bordeaux has many shopping options. In the heart of Bordeaux is Rue Sainte-Catherine. This pedestrian-only shopping street has  of shops, restaurants and cafés; it is also one of the longest shopping streets in Europe. Rue Sainte-Catherine starts at Place de la Victoire and ends at Place de la Comédie by the Grand Théâtre. The shops become progressively more upmarket as one moves towards Place de la Comédie and the nearby Cours de l'Intendance is where one finds the more exclusive shops and boutiques.

Culture 

Bordeaux is also the first city in France to have created, in the 1980s, an architecture exhibition and research centre, Arc en rêve. Bordeaux offers a large number of cinemas, theatres, and is the home of the Opéra national de Bordeaux. There are many music venues of varying capacity. The city also offers several festivals throughout the year. In October 2021, Bordeaux was shortlisted for the European Commission's 2022 European Capital of Smart Tourism award along with Copenhagen, Dublin, Florence, Ljubljana, Palma de Mallorca and Valencia.

Transport

Road 

Bordeaux is an important road and motorway junction. The city is connected to Paris by the A10 motorway, with Lyon by the A89, with Toulouse by the A62, and with Spain by the A63. There is a  ring road called the "Rocade" which is often very busy. Another ring road is under consideration.

Bordeaux has five road bridges that cross the Garonne, the Pont de pierre built in the 1820s and three modern bridges built after 1960: the Pont Saint Jean, just south of the Pont de pierre (both located downtown), the Pont d'Aquitaine, a suspension bridge downstream from downtown, and the Pont François Mitterrand, located upstream of downtown. These two bridges are part of the ring-road around Bordeaux. A fifth bridge, the Pont Jacques-Chaban-Delmas, was constructed in 2009–2012 and opened to traffic in March 2013. Located halfway between the Pont de pierre and the Pont d'Aquitaine and serving downtown rather than highway traffic, it is a vertical-lift bridge with a height in closed position comparable to that of Pont de pierre, and to the Pont d'Aquitaine when open. All five road bridges, including the two highway bridges, are open to cyclists and pedestrians as well.
Another bridge, the Pont Jean-Jacques Bosc, is to be built in 2018.

Lacking any steep hills, Bordeaux is relatively friendly to cyclists. Cycle paths (separate from the roadways) exist on the highway bridges, along the riverfront, on the university campuses, and incidentally elsewhere in the city. Cycle lanes and bus lanes that explicitly allow cyclists exist on many of the city's boulevards. A paid bicycle-sharing system with automated stations was established in 2010.

Rail 

The main railway station, Gare de Bordeaux Saint-Jean, near the center of the city, has 12 million passengers a year. It is served by the French national (SNCF) railway's high speed train, the TGV, that gets to Paris in two hours, with connections to major European centers such as Lille, Brussels, Amsterdam, Cologne, Geneva and London. The TGV also serves Toulouse and Irun (Spain) from Bordeaux. A regular train service is provided to Nantes, Nice, Marseille and Lyon. The Gare Saint-Jean is the major hub for regional trains (TER) operated by the SNCF to Arcachon, Limoges, Agen, Périgueux, Langon, Pau, Le Médoc, Angoulême and Bayonne.

Historically the train line used to terminate at a station on the right bank of the river Garonne near the Pont de Pierre, and passengers crossed the bridge to get into the city. Subsequently, a double-track steel railway bridge was constructed in the 1850s, by Gustave Eiffel, to bring trains across the river direct into Gare de Bordeaux Saint-Jean. The old station was later converted and in 2010 comprised a cinema and restaurants.

The two-track Eiffel bridge with a speed limit of  became a bottleneck and a new bridge was built, opening in 2009. During the planning there was much lobbying by the Eiffel family and other supporters to preserve the old bridge as a footbridge across the Garonne, with possibly a museum to document the history of the bridge and Gustave Eiffel's contribution. The decision was taken to save the bridge, but by early 2010 no plans had been announced as to its future use. The bridge remains intact, but unused and without any means of access.

Since July 2017, the LGV Sud Europe Atlantique is fully operational and makes Bordeaux city 2h04 from Paris.

Air 

Trams, buses and boats 

Bordeaux has an important public transport system called Transports Bordeaux Métropole (TBM). This company is run by the Keolis group. The network consists of:
 4 tram lines (A, B, C and D)
 75 bus routes, all connected to the tramway network (from 1 to 96)
 13 night bus routes (from 1 to 16)
 An electric bus shuttle in the city centre
 A boat shuttle on the Garonne river
This network is operated from 5 am to 2 am.

There had been several plans for a subway network to be set up, but they stalled for both geological and financial reasons. Work on the Tramway de Bordeaux system was started in the autumn of 2000, and services started in December 2003 connecting Bordeaux with its suburban areas. The tram system uses Alstom APS a form of ground-level power supply technology developed by French company Alstom and designed to preserve the aesthetic environment by eliminating overhead cables in the historic city. Conventional overhead cables are used outside the city. The system was controversial for its considerable cost of installation, maintenance and also for the numerous initial technical problems that paralysed the network. Many streets and squares along the tramway route became pedestrian areas, with limited access for cars.

The planned Bordeaux tramway system is to link with the airport to the city centre towards the end of 2019.

Taxis 

There are more than 400 taxicabs in Bordeaux.

Public transportation statistics 

The average amount of time people spend commuting with public transit in Bordeaux, for example to and from work, on a weekday is 51 min. 12.% of public transit riders, ride for more than 2 hours every day. The average amount of time people wait at a stop or station for public transit is 13 min, while 15.5% of riders wait for over 20 minutes on average every day.

Sport 

The 41,458-capacity Nouveau Stade de Bordeaux is the largest stadium in Bordeaux. The stadium was opened in 2015 and replaced the Stade Chaban-Delmas, which was a venue for the FIFA World Cup in 1938 and 1998, as well as the 2007 Rugby World Cup. In the 1938 FIFA World Cup, it hosted a violent quarter-final known as the Battle of Bordeaux. The ground was formerly known as the Stade du Parc Lescure until 2001, when it was renamed in honour of the city's long-time mayor, Jacques Chaban-Delmas.

There are two major sport teams in Bordeaux, Girondins de Bordeaux is the football team, playing in Ligue 2, the second tier of French football. Union Bordeaux Bègles is a rugby team in the Top 14 in the Ligue Nationale de Rugby.
Skateboarding, rollerblading, and BMX biking are activities enjoyed by many young inhabitants of the city. Bordeaux is home to a beautiful quay which runs along the Garonne river. On the quay there is a skate-park divided into three sections. One section is for Vert tricks, one for street style tricks, and one for little action sports athletes with easier features and softer materials. The skate-park is very well maintained by the municipality.

Bordeaux is also the home to one of the strongest cricket teams in France and are champions of the South West League.

There is a  wooden velodrome, Vélodrome du Lac, in Bordeaux which hosts international cycling competition in the form of UCI Track Cycling World Cup events.

The 2015 Trophee Eric Bompard was in Bordeaux. But the Free Skate was cancelled in all of the divisions due to the Paris  and aftermath. The Short Program occurred hours before the bombing. French skaters Chafik Besseghier (68.36) in tenth place, Romain Ponsart (62.86) in 11th. Mae-Berenice-Meite (46.82) in 11th and Laurine Lecavelier (46.53) in 12th. Vanessa James/Morgan Cipres (65.75) in second.

Between 1951 and 1955, an annual Formula 1 motor race was held on a 2.5-kilometre circuit which looped around the Esplanade des Quinconces and along the waterfront, attracting drivers such as Juan Manuel Fangio, Stirling Moss, Jean Behra and Maurice Trintignant.

Notable people 

Ausonius (310–395), Roman poet and teacher of rhetoric
Jean Alaux (1786–1864), painter
Bertrand Andrieu (1761–1822), engraver
Jean Anouilh (1910–1987), dramatist
Lucien Arman (1811–1873), shipbuilder and politician
Yvonne Arnaud (1892–1958), pianist, singer and actress
Xavier Arnozan (1852–1928), physician
Floyd Ayité (born 1988), Togolese footballer
Jonathan Ayité (born 1985), Togolese footballer
Christine Barbe, winemaker
Jean-Baptiste Barrière (1707-1747), cellist, composer
Gérard Bayo (born 1936), writer and poet,
François Bigot (1703–1778), last "Intendant" of New France
Arnaud Binard (born 1971), actor and producer
Rosa Bonheur (1822–1899), animal painter and sculptor
Grégory Bourdy (born 1982), golfer
Samuel Boutal (born 1969), footballer
Edmond de Caillou (died c. February 1316) Gascon knight fighting in Scotland
Gérald Caussé, Presiding Bishop of The Church of Jesus Christ of Latter Day Saints
René Clément (1913–1996), actor, director, writer
Jean-René Cruchet (1875–1959), pathologist
Boris Cyrulnik (born 1937), psychiatrist and psychoanalyst
Damia (1899–1978), singer and actress
Étienne Noël Damilaville (1723–1768), encyclopédiste
Lili Damita (1901–1994), actress
Frédéric Daquin, (born 1978), footballer
Danielle Darrieux (born 1917), actress
Bernard Delvaille (1931–2006), poet, essayist
David Diop (1927–1960), poet
Jean-Francois Domergue, footballer
Eleanor of Aquitaine (1122–1204), duchess of Aquitaine, queen of France and queen of England
Jacques Ellul (1912–1994), sociologist, theologian, Christian anarchist
Jean Eustache (1938-1981), Nouvelle Vague director
Marie Fel (1713–1794), opera singer
Jean-Luc Fournet (1965), papyrologist
Pierre-Jean Garat (1762–1823), singer
Armand Gensonné (1758–1793), politician
Sébastien Gervais (born 1976), professional footballer
Stephen Girard (1750–1831), merchant, banker, and Philadelphia philanthropist
Jérôme Gnako (born 1968), footballer
Randolphe Gohi (born 1969), former professional footballer
Eugène Goossens (1867–1958), conductor, violinist
Anna Hamilton (1864–1935), doctor, superintendent of the Protestant Hospital at Bordeaux (1901–1934)
Adolphe Jacquies (c. 1798–1860), Canadian shopkeeper, printer, trade unionist, and newspaper publisher
Pierre Lacour (1745–1814), painter
Léopold Lafleurance (1865–1953), flautist
Joseph Henri Joachim Lainé (1767–1835), statesman
Sainte Jeanne de Lestonnac (1556–1640), Roman Catholic saint and foundress of the Sisters of the Company of Mary, Our Lady
Christophe Lestrade (born 1969), former professional footballer
André Lhote (1885–1962), cubist painter
Jeanne Henriette Louis, (1938), professor of North American civilization
Jean-Baptiste Lynch (1749–1835), politician
Lucenzo (born 1983), singer
Jean-Jacques Magendie (1766–1835), officer
François Magendie (1783–1855), physiologist
Bruno Marie-Rose (born 1965), athlete (sprinter)
Albert Marquet, (1875–1947), painter
François Mauriac (1885–1970), writer, Nobel laureate 1952
Benjamin Millepied (born 1977), dancer and choreographer
Édouard Molinaro (1928–2013), film director, screenwriter
Pierre Molinier (1900–1976), painter, photographer
Michel de Montaigne (1533–1592), essayist
Montesquieu (1689–1755), man of letters and political philosopher
Olivier Mony (1966–), writer and literary critic
Étienne Marie Antoine Champion de Nansouty (1768–1815), general
Elie Okobo, basketball player
Pierre Palmade (born 1968), actor and comedian
St. Paulinus of Nola (354–431), educator, religious figure
Émile Péreire (1800–1875), banker and industrialist
Sophie Pétronin (born 1945), aid worker and humanitarian
Albert Pitres (1848–1928), neurologist
Hippolyte Pradelles (1824–1913), naturalist painter
Georges Antoine Pons Rayet (1839–1906), astronomer, discoverer of the Wolf-Rayet stars, & founder of the Bordeaux Observatory
Odilon Redon (1840–1916), painter
Richard II of England (1367–1400), king
Pierre Rode (1774–1830), violinist
Olinde Rodrigues (1795–1851), mathematician, banker and social reformer
Marie-Sabine Roger (born 1957), writer
Bernard Sarrette (1765–1858), conductor and music pedagogue
Jean-Jacques Sempé (1932–2022), cartoonist
Florent Serra (born 1981), tennis player
Alfred Smith, (1854–1932), painter
Soko (born 1985), singer
Philippe Sollers, (born 1936), writer
Wilfried Tekovi, (born 1989), Togolese footballer
Elie Vinet (1509–1587), historian and humanist of the Renaissance

International relationships

Twin towns – sister cities 

Bordeaux is twinned with:

 Ashdod, Israel, since 1984
 Bilbao, Spain
 Baku, Azerbaijan, since 1985
 Bristol, United Kingdom, since 1947
 Casablanca, Morocco, since 1988
 Fukuoka, Japan, since 1982
 Kraków, Poland, since 1993
 Lima, Peru, since 1957
 Los Angeles, California United States, since 1968
 Madrid, Spain, since 1984
 Munich, Germany, since 1964
 Oran, Algeria, since 2003
 Porto, Portugal, since 1978
 Quebec City, Quebec Canada, since 1962
 Ramallah, Palestine
 Riga, Latvia
 Saint Petersburg, Russia, since 1993
 Wuhan, China, since 1998

Partnerships 

 Samsun, Turkey, since 2010

See also 

Bordeaux wine regions
Bordeaux–Paris, a formerly professional road bicycle racing annual event
The Burdigalian Age of the Miocene Epoch is named for Bordeaux
Canelé, a local pastry
Communes of the Gironde department
Dogue de Bordeaux, a breed of dog originally bred for dog fighting
French wine
List of mayors of Bordeaux
Operation Frankton, a British Combined Operations raid on shipping in the harbour at Bordeaux, in December 1942, during World War II
Roman Catholic Archdiocese of Bordeaux
Girondins
 Atlantic history
 History of slavery

Notes

References

Bibliography

External links 

Bordeaux : the world capital of wine – Official French website (in English)

 
Communes of Gironde
Port cities and towns on the French Atlantic coast
Prefectures in France
World Heritage Sites in France
Cities in France
Gironde
Gallia Aquitania
Guyenne
 
Cities in Nouvelle-Aquitaine